Danny J Lewis is an English house and garage producer.

Biography
He is best known for the 1998 hit "Spend the Night" which reached No. 29 on the UK Singles Chart and No. 1 on the UK Dance Singles Chart.

Lewis was inspired by the New York house sound and DJ/producers such as Masters at Work, David Morales and Frankie Knuckles. He has worked with other artists such as Ben Westbeech, Bugz in the Attic's Daz I Kue (Darren Benjamin), Mark Robertson (Spiritual South) and Mike City.

References

External links

English house musicians
English record producers
UK garage musicians
DJs from London
Remixers
Year of birth missing (living people)
Living people
Electronic dance music DJs
Locked On Records artists